Open High School is an alternative public high school in urban Oregon Hill in Richmond, Virginia. It was established in 1972 with the intention of helping students become independent, self-determined thinkers and learners. Students volunteer at a variety of places, take college courses for high school and college credit, and independently develop and maintain a class schedule. The school building was originally built with money and on land donated by Grace Arents.

Structure

Open High School has a community-based structure where advisory homeroom-like groups known as "families" direct students in the development of school activities, functions, and other school related activities. Each family selects two student reps to represent them in a Student Representative Council.

At meetings of this council, student reps bring forth questions, disagreements, or ideas that a "family" may have and would like to discuss with the whole student body. If a concern gets enough attention, it is brought up during a monthly "town meeting", where the entire administrative staff and student body come together to discuss and vote on anything that a single student or group of students may deem important.

Open High School does not have as many students as other high schools throughout Richmond due to the building's smaller size. This allows for a smaller student-teacher ratio.

Students are able to create their own elective classes with teacher sponsors.

Notable alumni
 Anne Holton, Secretary of Education for the Commonwealth of Virginia from 2014 to 2016 and wife of Tim Kaine, who was the vice-presidential running mate of Hillary Clinton in the 2016 election.,
 Aimee Mann, American rock singer.
 Noah Scalin, contemporary artist in Richmond, Virginia.

See also
 Alternative education

References

External links
 Open High Announcements YouTube page
 Open High School website

High schools in Richmond, Virginia
Public high schools in Virginia
Magnet schools in Virginia
Alternative schools in the United States
Educational institutions established in 1972
1972 establishments in Virginia